The Harwich Harbour Ferry is a foot and bicycle ferry for 58 passengers that runs from April until end of October between Ha'penny Pier near Harwich to Landguard Fort near Felixstowe and Shotley marina. As well as for local traffic, this ferry can be used as a short cut on the Suffolk Coast Path; it takes bicycles, prams, e-bikes and is used by National Cycle Route NCR 51 and the North Sea Cycle Route.

The service was later started with the MV Explorer 12, a Sea Truck, which is owned by Austrian Christian Zemann and his English wife Lucy Zemann and licensed to carry 12 passengers.

As of 2016 the service is provided by the simply-named Harbour Ferry. The boat was once a lifeboat from the liner SS Canberra and is now licensed and equipped for 58 passengers.

See also 
 Felixstowe
 Harwich International Port
 Landguard Fort
 Local Ferries in Suffolk
 National Cycle Route 51
 North Sea Cycle Route
 Suffolk Coast Path

References

External links 
 Official Harbour Ferry website (fares and timetables)
 http://www.sealwatching.co.uk
 Harwich, Felixstowe and Shotley Foot Ferry Society
 Harwich International Port

Ferry transport in England
Transport in Essex
Transport in Suffolk
Harwich
British Rail ferry service